Šah may refer to:

Chess, a board game, Šah in alternative language
Shah, a Persian term for a king